Chen Haixia (born 11 February 1987 in Zengcheng, Guangdong) is a female Chinese rower.

Major performances
2005 World Cup (Leg 3) – 1st LW2X;
2005 National Games – 2nd LW2X/LW4X;
2006/2007 World Championships – 1st LW4X/6th LW2X;
2006 National Championships – 1st LW4X;
2007 World Cup Leg 1/Leg2 – 2nd/1st LW2X

References

1987 births
Living people
Chinese female rowers
Sportspeople from Guangzhou
World Rowing Championships medalists for China
Rowers from Guangdong
20th-century Chinese women
21st-century Chinese women